Mandeville North (commonly referred to as Mandeville) is a small village in the Waimakariri District of Canterbury, New Zealand. Due to new subdivisions being built in the area, the population has been slowly increasing, particularly after the 2011 Christchurch earthquake. The construction of the Mandeville village retail development began in late 2017 and was completed in early 2018.

The village is named after William Montagu, 7th Duke of Manchester who owned land in the area.

Demographics

Mandeville-Ohoka had a population of 3,210 at the 2018 New Zealand census, an increase of 762 people (31.1%) since the 2013 census, and an increase of 1,383 people (75.7%) since the 2006 census. There were 1,056 households. There were 1,638 males and 1,572 females, giving a sex ratio of 1.04 males per female. The median age was 43.5 years (compared with 37.4 years nationally), with 750 people (23.4%) aged under 15 years, 429 (13.4%) aged 15 to 29, 1,608 (50.1%) aged 30 to 64, and 426 (13.3%) aged 65 or older.

Ethnicities were 95.8% European/Pākehā, 6.6% Māori, 0.5% Pacific peoples, 2.4% Asian, and 1.3% other ethnicities (totals add to more than 100% since people could identify with multiple ethnicities).

The proportion of people born overseas was 17.1%, compared with 27.1% nationally.

Although some people objected to giving their religion, 53.1% had no religion, 39.0% were Christian, 0.3% were Hindu, 0.1% were Buddhist and 1.1% had other religions.

Of those at least 15 years old, 564 (22.9%) people had a bachelor or higher degree, and 336 (13.7%) people had no formal qualifications. The median income was $44,300, compared with $31,800 nationally. The employment status of those at least 15 was that 1,368 (55.6%) people were employed full-time, 429 (17.4%) were part-time, and 48 (2.0%) were unemployed.

Sports grounds 
The Mandeville Sports Centre is located less than 1km south of the village centre. A number of sports are played at the complex, however, it is most well known as a cricket ground. Since 2008, the inaugural Canterbury Rodeo has been hosted here.

References

External links 
 Mandeville Sports Club

Waimakariri District
Populated places in Canterbury, New Zealand